Mallory Snyder (born January 7, 1984) is an American model and television personality best known for her participation on MTV's reality television program  The Real World: Paris and her work as a swimsuit model for Sports Illustrated.

Early life
Born in Palatine, Illinois Snyder is a 2002 graduate of William Fremd High School. Her father, Todd Snyder, played professional American football in the NFL for the Atlanta Falcons from 1970 to 1973.

Career

The Real World
Snyder first appeared in the public eye when she appeared as a cast member on The Real World: Paris, which aired in 2003.  Snyder was known on the show as a virgin who gave up her soccer scholarship at Iowa State University to participate in the taping of the show. Snyder's looks gained the attention of the males in the house, especially Adam King and Ace Amerson, the latter whom she eventually dated.

Modeling career
Upon returning from Paris, Snyder decided to try modeling and almost immediately found success, appearing in the 2005 and 2006 Sports Illustrated magazine's annual swimsuit issue. She has also modeled for the Abercrombie & Fitch and J.Crew clothing lines in addition to a 2006 appearance in Self magazine.  In 2009 Mallory Snyder was voted USA Top Model of the year.

Television appearances

References

External links

Sports Illustrated Swimsuit Gallery, 2006
USA Top Model 2009 

1984 births
Living people
Female models from Illinois
The Real World (TV series) cast members
People from Palatine, Illinois
The Challenge (TV series) contestants
21st-century American women